Kubang Pasu may refer to:
Kingdom of Kubang Pasu Darul Qiyam, a historical Malay kingdom in the area
Kubang Pasu District
Kubang Pasu (federal constituency), represented in the Dewan Rakyat
Kubang Pasu Barat (federal constituency), formerly represented in the Dewan Rakyat (1959–74)
Kubang Pasu Barat (state constituency), formerly represented in the Kedah State Council (1955–59)